Konrad X the White (Polish: Konrad X Biały) (1420 – 21 September 1492) was a duke of Oleśnica, Koźle, and half of both Bytom and Ścinawa during 1450–1452 (with his brother as co-rulers), since 1452 sole ruler over half of Ścinawa, during 1471–1472 sole ruler over Koźle and whole Bytom, and since 1478 sole ruler over Oleśnica.

He was the second son of Konrad V Kantner, Duke of Oleśnica, by his wife Margareta.

Life
After his father's death in 1439, Konrad X and his older brother Konrad IX the Black were excluded from the government by their uncle Konrad VII the White, who ruled until 1450, when Konrad X and Konrad IX deposed him and took over the Duchy as co-rulers; however, two years later, in 1452, they decided to divide their domains. Konrad X obtained half of Ścinawa.

During the wars between Bohemia and Hungary, he initially supported King George of Poděbrady and paid homage to him with his brother Konrad IX in 1459 in exchange for the confirmation of the possession of their father's Duchy; however, when the Hungarian troops entered in Silesia, Konrad X and Konrad IX repudiated his alliance with Bohemia and paid homage to King Matthias Corvinus.

After the death of his brother in 1471, Konrad X reunited the entire duchy in his hands, except Oleśnica, which was the dower of his sister-in-law Margareta of Rawa and later ruled by his niece Barbara. In view of his deep debts, he sold his Upper Silesian domains to Duke Henry I the Older of Ziębice.

In 1472 Koźle and Bytom were annexed by the Kingdom of Bohemia, and three years later, in 1475, Konrad X managed to deprive Margareta from the effective rule over Oleśnica, who then passed to her daughter Barbara, who remained under the tutelage of her uncle until 1478, when she was also deposed by Konrad X, who finally could take the control over that land.

When Konrad X couldn't deal with his debts, he tried to sell his lands to the rulers of Saxony, which led the intervention of King Matthias and the Teutonic Order in 1480. At the end, Konrad X could make a settlement with the Hungarian King, under which Konrad X recognized him as King of Bohemia and he was obliged to enter in the coalition of Olomouc. In 1488, he attempted to invalidate his alliance with King Matthias by joining in a coalition with Jan II the Mad, Duke of Głogów and Henry I the Older, but was defeated in 1489 by the Hungarian forces. After the death of King Matthias in 1490 he could recover the full government over Oleśnica, Syców and Wąsosz.

Konrad X married with Dorothea Reynkenberg (d. 6 January 1471), daughter of Nikolaus (or Nikodemus) Reynkenberg, a coppersmith. According to the standards of the House of Piast, the marriage was considered morganatic, and Dorothea was forbidden to assume the titles and rank of her husband. They had no children.

With him, the Oleśnica branch of the Piast dynasty became extinct. Half of Ścinawa was taken by Duke Casimir II of Cieszyn and Oleśnica was obtained by Henry I the Older.

Notes

References

Chronological Dates in Stoyan
Morganatic and Unequal Marriages in German Law
This article was translated from his original in Polish Wikipedia.

|-

|-

|-

|-

|-

|-

1420 births
1492 deaths
Piast dynasty
Place of birth unknown